Brampton Manor Academy (formerly Brampton Manor School) is an 11–19 mixed, secondary school and selective sixth form with academy status in East Ham, London, England. It is the second largest school in the London Borough of Newham.
In 2019, 41 of its students were offered Oxbridge places; in 2020 the number was 51 and in 2021 it was 55 (7 more than Eton College). By 2022, 85 students secured places at Oxbridge, whilst 185 students achieved 3 or more A* grades.

History 
Brampton Girls School was built on the current site between 1957 and 1962. It converted to an academy in 2011.

Buildings  
In 2019 the school expanded from 10 forms of entry (10fe) to (14fe).

The school's former purpose-built sixth form centre opened in September 2012.

Renovation projects 
There have been extensive renovations of the school in since the school became an academy in 2011. A new sports hall was built and the old sports hall has been turned into a drama studio with a theatre at the front as Brampton Manor is now a specialist performing arts academy. There is also a new Media/Art suite, with a chill out area and media rooms for both performing, recording and dance use. In 2019 new accommodation has been started in a 5,339 sqm stand alone block for the incoming Year 7 students. This is alongside an expanded sixth form centre (871 sqm). The catering facilities have been expanded to deal with the growing student population.

Results 
The school was rated "outstanding" in its two most recent Ofsted inspections, which took place in 2012 and 2018.

In the 2018 Department for Education school league tables, Brampton Manor Academy ranked the highest achieving school in Newham at GCSE, with a Progress 8 score of 1.15, an Attainment 8 score of 59.2, 86% of students entering Ebacc, and an Ebacc Average Point Score of 5.25. The school also achieves outstanding A-Level results. In 2017 the school achieved a progress score at A-level of 0.63, the highest in Newham, with the vast majority of sixth-form students progressing on to higher education at Russell Group universities. In 2019, 41 of its students were offered Oxbridge places. In 2020, this rose to 51 students. In 2021, 55 Brampton Manor students received Oxbridge offers.  By August 2022, this figure rose to 85 students securing Oxbridge places, with 185 students achieving 3 or more A* grades and 95% of the cohort progressing to Russell Group Universities.

Notable alumni 
 Ravi Bopara, professional cricketer for England and Essex.
 Jade Ewen, finalist performer at Eurovision 2009 and member of Sugababes
 Ghetts, grime music artist
 Leah Harvey, stage and screen actor.
 Lee Hodges, professional footballer
 Rob May, musician and record producer
 Shayden Morris, professional footballer for Fleetwood Town
 Dudley O'Shaughnessy, model and actor
 Dominic Poleon, Professional footballer for Bradford City A.F.C.
 Rob Whiteman, chief executive of CIPFA
 Danny Woodards, professional footballer

See also 
Langdon Academy

References

External links 
 

Academies in the London Borough of Newham
Training schools in England
Secondary schools in the London Borough of Newham